The 1973 Pacific Conference Games was the second edition of the international athletics competition between five Pacific coast nations: Australia, Canada, Japan, New Zealand and the United States. It was held on June 27 and 28 in Toronto. A total of 20 men's and 12 women's athletics events were contested.

Medal summary

Men

Women

References

Pacific Conference Games. GBR Athletics. Retrieved on 2015-01-14.
Australia at the Games Pacific Conference Games - 1973 Toronto, Canada . Athletics Australia. Retrieved on 2015-01-15.

Pacific Conference Games
Pacific Conference Games
Pacific Conference Games
Pacific Conference Games
International track and field competitions hosted by Canada
Pacific Conference Games